Rondé is an indie pop band from Utrecht in the Netherlands that was formed in 2014. The group consists of singer Rikki Borgelt, bassist Cas Oomen, guitarist Armel Paap and drummer Sharon Zarr. Rondé won the 3FM Serious Talent Award from Dutch radio station NPO 3FM in 2015.

History 
A school assignment at the Herman Brood Academie led to the formation of Rondé in the spring of 2014. In April of that year the band took part in "Herman Brood Academie on Tour", a short tour along various Dutch pop stages.

In October 2014, Rondé and their single Run were proclaimed 3FM Serious Talent and 3FM Megahit respectively. After their performance at Eurosonic Noorderslag in 2015, Rondé's singer Rikki Borgelt had surgery on her vocal cords due to vocal cord nodules. In April 2015 the band won the 3FM Serious Talent Award, and a few days later their single We Are One became Rondé's second 3FM Megahit.

The band's first album, the eponymous Rondé, was released on 13 January 2017. Their second album Flourish was released on 8 March 2019, containing twelve songs including 3FM Megahit Calling. Another 3FM Megahit by Rondé, Get To You, was released in 2020.

Discography

Albums 

|-
|align="left"|Rondé||13-01-2017||21-01-2017||18||20||
|-
|align="left"|Flourish||08-03-2019||16-03-2019||8||3||
|}

Singles 

|-
|align="left"|Run||07-11-2014||14-02-2015||tip2||-|| Gold record
|-
|align="left"|We Are One||10-04-2015||02-05-2015||tip12||-||
|-
|align="left"|Run (East & Young remix)||26-06-2015||11-07-2015||tip7||-|| Nr. 73 in the Dutch Single Top 100
|-
|align="left"|Why Do You Care||19-08-2016||27-08-2016||tip1||-||
|-
|align="left"|Naturally||06-01-2017||11-02-2017||31||5||
|-
|align="left"|Headlights||2017||20-05-2017||tip11||-||
|-
|align="left"|City Lights||2017||16-09-2017||tip9||-||
|-
|align="left"|Calling||2018||15-09-2018||tip8||-||
|-
|align="left"|Be Mine||2019||19-01-2019||tip13||-||
|-
|align="left"|Hard to Say Goodbye||13-08-2021||18-09-2021||8||8|| Nr. 35 in the Dutch Single Top 100
|-
|align="left"|Love Myself||2022||16-04-2022||5||10*||
|-
|align="left"|Bright Eyes||2022||07-10-2022||9||11*||
|}

Awards 
 2015 - Winner 3FM Serious Talent Award
 2018 - Winner  (with Naturally)

 Run: 3FM Megahit, two times 
 We Are One: 3FM Megahit
 Why Do You Care: 3FM Megahit,  (Radio 538)
 Naturally: Topsong NPO Radio 2,  (Radio 538), 
 Headlights: Topsong NPO Radio 2
 Calling: Topsong NPO Radio 2, 3FM Megahit
 Get To You: 3FM Megahit
 Hard To Say Goodbye:  (Radio 538), Favourite Track (Radio 538), 3FM Megahit

References 

Dutch pop music groups
Indie pop groups
Musical groups established in 2014
2014 establishments in the Netherlands